The Vancouver Island Crimson Tide are a Canadian rugby union team based in Victoria, British Columbia. The team plays in the Coastal Cup.

The Tide play their home games at the Windsor Park in Victoria.

The team hold the record for winning the most MacTier Cups.

History
In 1998, Rugby Canada and the provincial unions agreed to form the Rugby Canada Super League. Fourteen unions and sub-unions were invited to compete in the new semi-professional league.

In 2009, Rugby Canada decided to disband the RCSL after 11 seasons of Super League play in Canada. The RCSL was replaced by the Rugby Canada National Junior Championship. The league contains many of the junior RCSL clubs.

Season-by-season records

|-
|1998 || 5 || 0 || 1 || 1st West Division || Won MacTier Cup (Halifax Keiths)
|-
|1999 || 6 || 0 || 0 || 1st West Division || Won MacTier Cup (Toronto Renegades)
|-
|2000 || 3 || 2 || 0 || 3rd West Division || --
|-
|2001 || 4 || 1 || 0 || 2nd West Division || --
|-
|2002 || 4 || 1 || 0 || 1st West Division || Won MacTier Cup (Newfoundland Rock)
|-
|2003 || 4 || 2 || 0 || 2nd West Division || --
|-
|2004 || 6 || 0 || 0 || 1st West Division || Won MacTier Cup (Newfoundland Rock)
|-
|2005 || 5 || 1 || 0 || 2nd West Division || --
|-
|2006 || 1 || 3 || 0 || 5th West Division || --
|-
|2007 || 1 || 3 || 0 || 4th West Division || --
|-
|2008 || 1 || 3 || 0 || 4th West Division || --
|-
!rowspan="3"|Totals || 40 || 16 || 1
|colspan="2"| (regular season, 1998–2008)
|-
! 4 || 0 || 0
|colspan="2"| (playoffs, 1998–2008)
|-

Personnel

Current squad

The 2021 Crimson Tide squad for the 2021 Coastal Cup.

Coaching Staff

Head Coach: Nanyak Dala
Assistant Coach: Sean White

See also
Coastal Cup

External links
 Official site

Sports teams in Victoria, British Columbia
Rugby union teams in British Columbia